Jeffrey Chernov is an American film producer, unit production manager and executive.

He was the Vice President of Physical Production for Walt Disney Pictures and Television/Touchstone Pictures/Hollywood Pictures from 1987 through 1989 and the Senior Vice President of Physical Production at Spyglass Entertainment from 2001 through 2005.

He has also served as a first and second assistant director. Early in his career, he frequently collaborated with filmmaker John Carpenter.

During his time with Disney/Touchstone/Hollywood, Chernov oversaw production on such films as Dead Poets Society and Pretty Woman. Afterwards, he became an independent producer, although he would produce or executive produce a number of movies for Touchstone.

In 2001 he was appointed Senior VP of production at Spyglass. He is credited as production executive on many films produced by Spyglass.

Chernov made his directorial debut with A Line in the Sand, which he is also producing.

He recently worked as executive producer on Star Trek for J. J. Abrams and Paramount Pictures, replacing Stratton Leopold. His son Max and daughter Zoe had small roles in the film as a young Spock's Vulcan schoolmates.

Filmography
 Richard Pryor: Live in Concert (1979) – associate producer
 Escape from New York (1981) – second assistant director
 Body Heat (1981) – second assistant director
 Halloween II (1981) – production manager
 The Thing (1982) – second assistant director
 Halloween III: Season of the Witch (1982) – unit production manager, executive in charge of production
 The Dead Zone (1983) – associate producer
 Fire and Ice (1982) – live-action production supervisor
 Children of the Corn (1984) – production executive
 The Philadelphia Experiment (1984) – first assistant director
 Starman (1984) – Second Unit first assistant director
 Clue (1985) – associate producer, Unit Production Manager
 Ruthless People (1986) – Unit Production Manager
 Eddie Murphy Raw (1987) – Co-producer, Production Manager
 Johnny Be Good (1988) – Co-producer, Unit Production Manager
 Sleeping with the Enemy (1991) – executive producer
 Homeward Bound: The Incredible Journey (1993) – producer
 Father Hood (1993) – executive producer
 Bad Company (1995) – producer
 First Kid (1996) – Co-producer
 Desperate Measures (1998) – executive producer
 Holy Man (1998) – executive producer
 10 Things I Hate About You (1999) – executive producer
 The Replacements (2000) – executive producer
 The Country Bears (2002) – producer
 Reign of Fire (2002) – production executive
 The Recruit (2003) – production executive
 Shanghai Knights (2003) – production executive
 Connie and Carla (2004) – production executive
 The Pacifier (2005) – production executive
 The Hitchhiker's Guide to the Galaxy (2005) – production executive
 Stay Alive (2006) – production executive
 Stick It (2006) – production executive
 The Lookout (2007) – production executive
 The Invisible (2007) – production executive
 Underdog (2007) – production executive
 Balls of Fury (2007) – production executive
 From a Place of Darkness (2008) – producer
 A Line in the Sand (2008) – Director, producer
 Star Trek (2009) – executive producer
 Battle: Los Angeles (2011) – producer
 Mission: Impossible – Ghost Protocol (2011) – executive producer
 Star Trek Into Darkness (2013) – executive producer
 Tomorrowland (2015) – producer
 Star Trek Beyond (2016) – executive producer
 Black Panther (2018) - executive producer
 Shazam! (2019) - executive producer

References

External links
 

American film producers
Living people
Year of birth missing (living people)